De Hoop is a gristmill in Bavel, Netherlands. The mill was built in 1865.

References

Flour mills in the Netherlands
Windmills in North Brabant